Ferrières - Fontenay is a railway station in Fontenay-sur-Loing, Centre-Val de Loire, France. The station is located on the Moret–Lyon railway. The station is served by Transilien line R (Paris-Gare de Lyon) operated by SNCF.

See also
Transilien Paris–Lyon

References

Railway stations in Loiret